The Committee on Civil Liberties, Justice and Home Affairs (LIBE) is a committee of the European Parliament that is responsible for protecting civil liberties and human rights, as listed in the Charter of Fundamental Rights of the European Union.

Its current chair, elected on 10 July 2019, is Juan Fernando López Aguilar, member of the S&D political group.

Responsibilities
Specifically, the committee deals with data protection issues; asylum, migration, and "integrated management of the common borders"; and the EU approach to criminal law", including police and judicial cooperation and terrorism, all while ensuring that the principles of subsidiarity and proportionality are respected. Additionally, it oversees several agencies of the European Union, including the European Monitoring Centre for Drugs and Drug Addiction and the European Union Agency for Fundamental Rights, Europol, Eurojust, the European Police College (Cepol), the European Public Prosecutor’s Office and other such agencies.

However, its purview does not include gender-based discrimination, which is overseen by the Committee on Women's Rights and Gender Equality, and employment discrimination, which is overseen by the Committee on Employment and Social Affairs.

Controversy
Udo Voigt, the former leader of the far-right National Democratic Party of Germany (NPD) who has praised Adolf Hitler, joined the committee as a non-attached member in July 2014, sparking outrage from European Parliament President Martin Schulz, the European Jewish Congress, and the European Network Against Racism, among others. Jan Philipp Albrecht, a German Green Party member and vice chair of the committee, expressed doubt about Voigt's ability to significantly influence the legislative process, but he did concede that "his presence could lead the public to question the European Parliament".

See also
 European Commissioner for Justice, Fundamental Rights and Citizenship
 Directorate-General for Justice
 European Commissioner for Home Affairs
 Directorate-General for Home Affairs
 Justice and Home Affairs Council (Council of the European Union)
 Directorate-General for Justice and Home Affairs

References

External links
Official webpage

Civil
Human rights organisations based in Belgium